Agnès Mercier is a French curler and curling coach.

She participated in the demonstration curling events at the 1988 Winter Olympics, where the French women's team finished in eighth place.

At the national level, she is a five-time French women's champion curler (1971, 1974, 1986, 1987, 1988).

Teams

Record as a coach of national teams

Personal life
Agnes Mercier is from family of curlers: her daughter Annick and son Thierry are known French curlers, many times French champions, they competed on 1988 and 1992 Winter Olympics, number of Worlds and Euros.

References

External links

 Ecole primaire Henry Jacques Le Même - MEGEVE (74) - Initiation curling

Living people
Sportspeople from Haute-Savoie
French female curlers
French curling champions
Curlers at the 1988 Winter Olympics
Olympic curlers of France
French curling coaches
Date of birth missing (living people)
Place of birth missing (living people)
Year of birth missing (living people)